Dehdaq (also Romanized as Deh Daq; also known as Dāhdak, Dehdagh, and Dehdak) is a village in Bidak Rural District, in the Central District of Abadeh County, Fars Province, Iran. At the 2006 census, its population was 746, in 204 families.

References 

Populated places in Abadeh County